Emma Jayne Mounkley (born 1981) is a former British Paralympic swimmer who competed in international level events.

References

1981 births
Living people
Sportspeople from Stockport
English female swimmers
Paralympic swimmers of Great Britain
Swimmers at the 2000 Summer Paralympics
Medalists at the 2000 Summer Paralympics
Paralympic medalists in swimming
Paralympic silver medalists for Great Britain
Paralympic bronze medalists for Great Britain
British female freestyle swimmers
British female breaststroke swimmers
British female butterfly swimmers
British female medley swimmers
S14-classified Paralympic swimmers